Antonio Subirana (1 May 1932 – 3 August 2010) was a Spanish water polo player. He competed in the men's tournament at the 1952 Summer Olympics.

References

1932 births
2010 deaths
Spanish male water polo players
Olympic water polo players of Spain
Water polo players at the 1952 Summer Olympics
Water polo players from Barcelona